Cesária Évora GCIH (27 August 194117 December 2011), more commonly known as Cize, was a Cape Verdean singer-songwriter. She received a Grammy Award in 2004 for her album Voz d'Amor. Nicknamed the "Barefoot Diva" for performing without shoes, she was known as the "Queen of Morna".

Évora began singing as a young woman in bars in her hometown of Mindelo, and came to international prominence in the 1990s.

Biography

Early life

Cesária Évora was born on 27 August 1941 in Mindelo, São Vicente, Cape Verde. When she was seven years old her father, Justino da Cruz Évora, who was a part-time musician, died, and at the age of ten she was placed in an orphanage, as her mother Dona Joana could not raise all six children. At the age of 16, she was persuaded by a friend to sing in a sailors' tavern.

She grew up at the house in Mindelo which other singers used from the 1940s to the 1970s, at 35 Rua de Moeda. Other Cape Verdean singers came to the house, including Djô d'Eloy, Bana, Eddy Moreno, Luis Morais and Manuel de Novas (also known as Manuel d'Novas), and it was there she received her musical education.

Musical career
In the 1960s, she started singing on Portuguese cruise ships stopping at Mindelo and on the local radio. In 1985, at the invitation of Cape Verdean singer Bana, she went to perform in Portugal. In Lisbon she was discovered by the producer José da Silva and invited to record in Paris.

She recorded the track "Ausência", composed by Yugoslav musician Goran Bregovic, which was released as the second track of the soundtrack of the film Underground (1995) by Emir Kusturica.

Évora's international success came only in 1988 with the release of her first commercial album La Diva Aux Pieds Nus, recorded in France. Before that album had been released, she recorded her first LP titled "Cesária" in 1987. This album was later released on CD in 1995 as Audiophile Legends. Her 1992 album Miss Perfumado sold over 300,000 copies worldwide. It included one of her most celebrated songs, "Sodade".

In 1994, Bau joined her touring band and two years later, he became her musical director up to September 1999.

Her 1995 album Cesária brought her international success and the first Grammy Award nomination. In 1997, she won the KORA All African Music Awards in three categories, including "Best Artist of West Africa", "Best Album" and "Merit of the Jury". In 2003, her album Voz d'Amor was awarded a Grammy in the World Music category.

In 2006, Évora met with Alberto Zeppieri, an Italian songwriter, journalist and record producer  and agreed to duet with Gianni Morandi, Gigi D'Alessio and Ron. The project, now in its fifth volume, gives visibility and raises funds for the UN World Food Programme, for which Évora was the ambassador from 2003.

Later in 2006, she released her next album Rogamar. It was a success and charted in six European countries including France, Poland and the Netherlands. On her tour in Australia in 2008, she suffered a stroke. In 2009, she released her final album Nha Sentimento which was recorded in Mindelo and Paris by José da Silva. The album reached number 6 in Poland and number 21 in France.

In 2009, she was made a knightess of the French Legion of Honour by the French Minister of Culture and Communications, Christine Albanel, the first Cape Verdean to become one.

She received her last award at the 2010 Kora All African Music Awards, the "Merit of the Jury" award for the second time.

Acting career
Évora had briefly engaged into acting by performing in two Cape Verdan films, Black Dju, a comedy directed by Pol Cruchten; and the critically acclaimed drama Napomuceno's Will, both released in 1997.

Personal life

Évora dated Eduardo de Jon Xalino when she lived at Rua de Moeda. She was also a relative of the great Bana, who emigrated from Montenegro in the 1880s with his maternal family (siblings Milo, Drago, Milica, who later married Santiago the great craftsman of Salamanca, Petrinja and Brano) after his mother, the great Djetinja, was abused by her late husband Petar Petrovic Njegos.

Her cousin was another singer Hermínia da Cruz Fortes. She was an aunt of António da Rocha Évora and Xavier da Cruz.

Awards and honors
 Grand-Cross of the Order of Prince Henry, Portugal (31 May 1999)

Death 
In 2010, Évora performed a series of concerts, the last of which was in Lisbon on 8 May. Two days later, after a heart attack, she underwent surgery at a local hospital in Paris. On the morning of 11 May 2010 she was taken off artificial pulmonary ventilation, and on 16 May she was discharged from the intensive-care unit and transported to a clinic for further treatment. In late September 2011, Évora's agent announced that she was ending her career due to poor health.

On 17 December 2011, aged 70, Évora died in São Vicente, Cape Verde, from respiratory failure and hypertension. A Spanish newspaper reported that 36 hours before her death she was still receiving people – and smoking – in her home in Mindelo, popular for always having its doors open.

Legacy 

 In 2003, she appeared on a Cape Verdean stamp.
 On 3 September 2013 her name was boosted publicly by the Belgian musician Stromae, when he released his album Racine carrée that includes "Ave Cesaria", a track that honours Évora, one of Stromae's favorite artists.
 On 22 December 2014 the Banco de Cabo Verde introduced a new series of banknotes that honor Cape Verdean figures in the fields of literature, music, and politics. Her face was featured in the new 2000 Escudos banknote.
 The awarded feature documentary Tchindas is a tribute to her after her death, and contains several of her songs.
 In December 2016, singer Fantcha launched a new album entitled Nôs Caminhada, in homage to her mentor Évora, including a number of traditional songs (mornas and coladeiras) that had been interpreted by Évora. It also features a very special song, "Nôs Caminhada", remembering the moments spent with the beloved one. The singer considers Évora as her second mom.
 On 27 August 2019, she was honored by a Google Doodle in Canada, and some European, African and Asian nations, on her 78th birthday.
 American singer and songwriter Madonna is a huge fan of Cesaria Evora and visited the Barefoot Diva backstage at several concerts, including in London in 2007. In 2017 the Queen of Pop moved to Lisbon where she learned more about Portuguese and Cabo Verdean music, among others. This inspired several songs and collaborations for her 14th studio album "Madame X" (2019). Subsequently, she invited several Cabo Verdean and Portuguese artists on her Madame X theater tour 2019–2020. This included Cesaria Evora's own percussionist & backing vocalist Miroca Paris, who performed with Cesaria from 2001 until 2011. The Cabo Verdean-Portuguese singer & multi-instrumentalist was invited to participate in her documentary "World of Madame X" (June 2019), to perform live at the Billboard Music Awards in Las Vegas 2019  with her single "Medellin" ft Maluma, and during her entire tour. Madonna included the traditional song made famous by Cesaria: Sodade, in some of her live performances of the Madame X Tour.
 Mãe Carinhosa ("Mother Affection" in Cape Verdean Creole), an album of previously unreleased tracks recorded by Evora between 1997 and 2005 and curated and produced by her longtime producer José da Silva, was released in 2013.

Named after

 On 8 March 2012 Cesária Évora Airport, Mindelo, Cape Verde's third busiest airport, was named after her. A statue of her was erected at the terminal entrance in the same year, and a mural was also added inside the terminal building.
 On 18 June 2014 a small street in the 19th arrondissement of Paris was named after her. It is located near Boulevard Macdonald in the Pont-de-Flandre quarter; by 2019 a large public park nearby the same street was also dedicated to her, complete with picnic tables, fruit trees, chess tables, table tennis and thematic lounges flanking the main pathway including four playgrounds. 
 Several other residential streets across Europe have been named for her, especially in France which have recently named a few streets after the singer.
 On 19 September 2014 the Seine-Saint-Denis department named a new college in Montreuil after her, located on Rue des Jardins Dufour.
 In 2014 or 2015, a street in the west of the Cape Verdean capital of Praia was named for her in Palmarejo Grande near Jean Piaget University. It intersects Avenida Eugenio Paula de Tavares.
 Two species of fauna are named after her: a butterfly in the family Lycaenidae named Chilades evorae which is found on the island of Santo Antão, and a species of sea slug called Aegires evorae, which exists in the northeast part of the island of Sal in the area of Calhetinha.

Discography

La Diva aux Pieds Nus (1988)
Distino di Belita (1990)
Mar Azul (1991)
Miss Perfumado (1992)
Cesária (1995)
Cabo Verde (1997)
Café Atlantico (1999)
São Vicente di Longe (2001)
Voz d'Amor (2003)
Rogamar (2006)
Nha Sentimento (2009)
Mãe Carinhosa (posthumous album, 2013)

References

Further reading

External links

Official website
Life and work of Cesária Évora, in Portuguese
Blog by the fans of Cesária Évora, the first page entirely in Portuguese

1941 births
2011 deaths
20th-century Cape Verdean women singers
Respiratory disease deaths in Cape Verde
Morna (music) singers
Grammy Award winners
People from Mindelo
Singers from São Vicente, Cape Verde
21st-century Cape Verdean women singers